Parish church of St. Gallus can mean:

 Parish church of St. Gallus, Bregenz, Austria
 Parish church of St. Gallus and Ulrich,  Kißlegg, Germany